The Ambo Province is one of eleven provinces of the Huánuco Region in Peru. The capital of this province is the city of Huacrachuco.

Boundaries
North: Huánuco Province
East: Pachitea Province
South: Pasco Region
West: Lauricocha Province

Geography 
Other mountains are listed below:

Political division
The province is divided into eight districts, which are:

 Ambo (Ambo)
 Cayna (Cayna)
 Colpas (Colpas)
 Conchamarca (Conchamarca)
 Huácar (Huácar)
 San Francisco (Mosca)
 San Rafael (San Rafael)
 Tomay Kichwa (Tomay Kichwa)

Ethnic groups 
The province is inhabited by indigenous citizens of Quechua descent. Spanish, however, is the language which the majority of the population (74.53%) learnt to speak in childhood, 25.22% of the residents started speaking using the Quechua language (2007 Peru Census).

See also 
 Awkimarka
 Hatun Uchku
 Pichqaqucha
 Yanaqucha

Sources 

Provinces of the Huánuco Region